Frank Kane may refer to:

 Frank Kane (author) (1912–1968), American detective fiction writer
 Frank Kane (baseball) (1895–1962), American MLB baseball player
 Francis Kane (ice hockey) (1923–2016), Canadian NHL, hockey player
 Frank E. Kane (born 1932), Canadian politician in the Legislative Assembly of New Brunswick

See also
Frank Caine (1881–1930), Australian rules footballer